The 2020–21 Arkansas State Red Wolves men's basketball team represented Arkansas State University during the 2020–21 NCAA Division I men's basketball season. The Red Wolves, led by fourth-year head coach Mike Balado, played their home games at the First National Bank Arena in Jonesboro, Arkansas as members of the Sun Belt Conference. With the creation of divisions to cut down on travel due to the COVID-19 pandemic, they played in the West Division.

Previous season
The Red Wolves finished the 2019–20 season 16–16, 8–12 in Sun Belt play to finish in a three-way tie for eighth place. As the No. 9 seed in the Sun Belt tournament, they lost in the first round to Louisiana.

Roster

Schedule and results

|-
!colspan=9 style=| Non-conference Regular season

|-
!colspan=9 style=| Conference Regular season

|-
!colspan=9 style=| Sun Belt tournament

References

Arkansas State Red Wolves men's basketball seasons
Arkansas State
Arkansas State Red Wolves men's basketball
Arkansas State Red Wolves men's basketball